John Keirs (1947–1995) was a Scottish professional footballer who played in the Football League as a central defender.

References

Sources

1947 births
1995 deaths
Scottish footballers
Association football defenders
Charlton Athletic F.C. players
Cape Town City F.C. (NFL) players
Stevenage Athletic F.C. players
Tonbridge Angels F.C. players
Maidstone United F.C. (1897) players
Weymouth F.C. players
Margate F.C. players
Folkestone F.C. players
Ebbsfleet United F.C. players
English Football League players
National League (English football) players
National Football League (South Africa) players